Terrible Dad is a 2022 Russian children's adventure comedy film directed by Karen Oganesyan and Yuri Korobeinikov. The film stars Yevgeni Grishkovetz as 
Tsar Ivan the Terrible, who travel to the past to fix a mistake and ends up in the present day. The cast also includes Kirill Käro, Ulyana Pilipenko, Erik Panich, and Irina Voronova.

Terrible Dad was released in theatres on 27 October 2022.

Synopsis
Having quarreled with his son, Tsar Ivan the Terrible accidentally mortally wounds him—as depicted in the painting by Ilya Repin. To fix this, Ivan, with the help of a magical grimoire from his legendary library, decides to travel to the past a moment before the fatal blow. However, everything does not go according to plan, and the tsar finds himself in our time, where he meets the Osipov family.

Nikita Osipov is an unsuccessful archaeologist and an equally unsuccessful father and husband. Recently divorced, he has lost contact with his children—Romka and Polya. The Osipov family becomes embroiled in Ivan's tale, as he tries to find the grimoire and save his son.

Cast and characters

Production
The companies Kargo Film and Irsna Media have been involved in the development of the project, which was carried out with the support of the Cinema Foundation of Russia.

Filming
Principal photography took place in September 2021 in Moscow, the region of Moscow Oblast, and Rostov Oblast. The main filming locations were Saint Basil's Cathedral and the Rostov Kremlin.

References

External links
 

2022 films
2020s Russian-language films
2020s children's adventure films
2020s children's comedy films
2020s adventure comedy films
Russian children's adventure films
Russian children's comedy films
Russian adventure comedy films
Films shot in Moscow
Films shot in Moscow Oblast